Marie Martinod (born 20 July 1984) is a French freestyle skier. She won two silver medals in the halfpipe at the 2014 and 2018 Winter Olympics. She also won three medals in the superpipe event at the Winter X Games : one gold in 2017 and two bronze in 2006 and 2014.

A 51-minute movie, Memories of my People (Au nom des miens), tells her story.

References

External links 
 
 
 
 
 

1984 births
Living people
French female freestyle skiers
Olympic freestyle skiers of France
Olympic silver medalists for France
Olympic medalists in freestyle skiing
Freestyle skiers at the 2014 Winter Olympics
Freestyle skiers at the 2018 Winter Olympics
Medalists at the 2014 Winter Olympics
Medalists at the 2018 Winter Olympics
X Games athletes
People from Bourg-Saint-Maurice
Sportspeople from Savoie